Cities and towns in Nepal are incorporated under municipality. A municipality in Nepal is a sub-unit of a district.  The Government of Nepal has set-out a minimum criteria for municipalities. These criteria include a certain population, infrastructure and revenues. Presently, there are 293 municipalities in Nepal among which 6 are metropolis, 11 are sub-metropolis and 276 are municipal councils. Other than that there are 460 rural municipalities totaling 753 local level government within Nepal.

Kathmandu, the capital, is also the largest city. In terms of area, Pokhara is the largest metropolitan city covering a subtotal of 464.28 km2 while Lalitpur is the smallest, with an area of 36.12 km2. Ghorahi is the largest sub-metropolitan city with an area of 522.21 km2 where as Dhangadhi is the largest sub-metropolitan city by a population of 204,788. Budhanilkantha with a population of 179,688 is the largest municipality followed by Birendranagar with a population of 154,886.

List of cities by classification
The list includes the cities and not urban agglomerations.

Classification:

The Ministry of Federal Affairs and General Administration has classified the local units into four grades based on infrastructure and social development.

The cities listed in bold are the capitals of their respective provinces of Nepal while that in bold and italic is the country capital.

Metropolitan cities

Sub-metropolitan cities

Municipality

150,000+

100,000+

75,000+

50,000+

25,000+

8,000+

List of cities in Nepal by population

Map

The list includes the cities and not urban agglomerations. 
The list includes the cities with 100,000+ population.

Definition:
The Ministry of Federal Affairs and General Administration has classified the local units into four grades based on infrastructure and social development:

 Metropolitan city
 Sub-metropolitan city
 Urban Municipality
 Rural Municipality - This list does not include Rural Municipality which is considered a village/rural area.

The cities listed in bold are the capitals of their respective provinces of Nepal while that in bold and italic is the country capital.

List of Metropolitan Areas in Nepal by population
The list includes the Metropolitan Areas which includes multiple cities and urban municipalities. The list of Metropolitan Area includes 300,000+ population.

List of cities in Nepal by past population based on past censuses
The list includes then existing municipalities as enumerated by the Central Bureau of Statistics (Nepal).
The list includes the cities and not urban agglomerations.

1991 Nepal census
The list of cities by population based on 1991 Nepal census are:

2001 Nepal census
The list of cities by population based on 2001 Nepal census are:

The list includes cities with more than 35,000 population.

2011 Nepal census
The list of cities by population based on 2011 Nepal census are:

The list includes cities with more than 40,000 population.

See also 
 Municipalities of Nepal — all city/urban + rural municipalities.

 Gaupalikas−Rural Municipalities of Nepal — current rural municipality + local government subdivision (est. 2017).
 List of gaupalikas−rural municipalities of Nepal
 
 Village development committees of Nepal (VDC) — former rural municipality + local government subdivision (1990-2016).
 List of village development committees of Nepal — (1990-2016).

References

External links 
Nepal Central Bureau of Statistics.gov: Census 2011 − Final results of population and housing of VDC-Village development committees/Municipalities−cities — Table 2 (p. 8).
 Ekendraonline.com: Cost of Living Index in Nepal — Statistics & Graphs of Nepalese Citizen's Economic Power (January 2014)

 01
 01
Cities
Cities
Cities in Asia by country